The Pakistan Muslim League (Jinnah) (Urdu: پاکستان مسلم لیگ جناح) was a political party in Pakistan. It was one of the factions of the original Pakistan Muslim League, named after the founder of Pakistan Muhammad Ali Jinnah.

PML (Jinnah) was formed by Manzoor Wattoo and Sardar Mushtaq Ahmed Khan Malezai in 1995 when they parted ways with Wattoo's cousin Hamid Nasir Chattha, who wanted to be the president of his own PML faction, PML (Junejo), which Wattoo and Mushtaq Khan were previously a part of. The differences cropped up in the same year when Wattoo was removed as the Punjab Chief Minister and Mushtaq Ahmed Khan was also removed as Law Minister of Punjab (Pakistan) in the power struggle between the province (headed by PML-Junejo) and the center (headed by rival PPP), leading Arif Nakai another PML (Junejo) candidate to be the new Chief Minister and Sardar Mushtaq Ahmed was replaced by his arch enemy Raja Sarfraz as the new minister.

In May 2004, PML (Jinnah) without Sardar Mushtaq Ahmed Khan Malezai who joined PML(N) in 1997 merged with PML (Q) along with other parties to form united PML.

However, in 2008 general election, Manzoor Wattoo and his daughter Rubina Shaheen Wattoo sought elections independently (and won 3 seats in total) while Sardar Mushtaq Ahmed Khan Malezai died before that in 2006. It was later stated that Wattoo will bring back PML (Jinnah) with help of Mushtaq Ahmed Khans brothers and the reason he didn't run on PML (Jinnah) ticket was because he failed the deadline to register it with the Election Commission.

In May 2008, Manzoor Wattoo along with his daughter Rubina Shaheen Wattoo left Pakistan Muslim League (Jinnah) and joined Pakistan Peoples Party.

Since their merger with PML-Q, this faction/break-away group is now defunct in the politics for the moment.

See also 
 Pakistan Muslim League (N)
 Pakistan Muslim League (Q)
 Pakistan Muslim League (Functional)
 Awami Muslim League

References

Political parties in Pakistan
Muslim League
Muslim League breakaway groups
Defunct political parties in Pakistan
P
Pakistan Muslim League (Q)
Political parties established in 1995
1995 establishments in Pakistan
Memorials to Muhammad Ali Jinnah